Church of Shrju was an Armenian church located near Tivi village (Ordubad district) of the Nakhchivan Autonomous Republic of Azerbaijan. The church was located some 2 km north-east to Tivi village, in the southeastern part of the abandoned village of Shrju.

History 
The founding date of the church is unknown. It was probably renovated in the 17th century.

Architecture 
The church was partially dilapidated in the late Soviet period, but the structure was sufficiently preserved. It was a basilica with a nave, two aisles, a five-sided apse on the exterior with two-storied vestries on either side.

Destruction 
The church was razed to ground at some point between 1997 and  June 15, 2006, as documented by investigation of the Caucasus Heritage Watch.

References 

Armenian churches in Azerbaijan
Ruins in Azerbaijan